Alma Carolina Viggiano Austria (born 6 July 1968) is a Mexican politician from the Institutional Revolutionary Party. She has served as Deputy of the LVIII LXI, and LXIII Legislatures of the Mexican Congress representing Hidalgo.

References

1968 births
Living people
Politicians from Hidalgo (state)
Women members of the Chamber of Deputies (Mexico)
Members of the Chamber of Deputies (Mexico)
Institutional Revolutionary Party politicians
21st-century Mexican politicians
21st-century Mexican women politicians
Mexican people of Italian descent